According to the Government of Burkina Faso, 433,778 tourists visited the country in 2011.

The Center

Ouagadougou
Sites of interest to tourists in Ouagadougou include: The Bangr Weogo Urban Park, National Museum of Burkina Faso, the International Art & Craft Fair, and the Panafrican Film and Television Festival of Ouagadougou.

Ziniaré
Sites of interest in Ziniaré include: the Ziniare Wildlife Park, the granite sculpture symposium, which takes place every two years, and the Museum of Manega.

Koudougou
Sites of interest in Koudougou include the sacred crocodiles of Sabou.

The West

Bobo-Dioulasso
 
Sites of interest in Bobo-Dioulasso include: the Grand Mosque, the mausoleum of Guimbi Ouattara, the Houet Provincial Museum, and the Guinguette.

Banfora
Sites of interest in Banfora include: the Natural Waterfall of Banfora, Lake Tengrela, and the Peaks of Sindou.

The East

Diapaga
Sites of interest in Diapaga include: Arli National Park, W National Park, and the cliffs of Gobnangou.

The Sahel

Djibo
Sites of interest in Djibo include the Archaeological Museum of Pobé Mengao and the stone carvings of Pobé Mengao.

Gorom Gorom
Sites of interest in Gorom Gorom include the Feminine Artisan Center of Gorom and the tourist camp of Gorom Gorom.

Visitor statistics

References

 
Burkina Faso